The 1863 Kaiapoi by-election was a by-election held on 2 September 1863 in the  electorate during the 3rd New Zealand Parliament.

The by-election was caused by the resignation of incumbent MP Isaac Cookson and was won unopposed by Robert Wilkin.

References

Kaiapoi 1863
1863 elections in New Zealand